Banco Económico, is a Bolivian bank and financial services company with headquarters in Santa Cruz de la Sierra.  It is a full-service corporation that provides a wide range of financial products and services to an individual and corporate client base through a national network.

History 
The "Banco Económico" emerged as a business purpose in December 1989 when a group of businessmen from the Santa Cruz region, Bolivia, linked mainly to productive and service activities, met with the concern of forming a long-term financial project, which, at from that region, expand to the rest of the country and later, abroad. In this way, Banco Económico S.A. was established. on May 16, 1990 in the city of Santa Cruz de la Sierra, beginning its financial operations on February 7, 1991.

References

External links
 

Banks of Bolivia
1991 establishments in Bolivia
Banks established in 1991